Joel Veeran (born 11 December 1998) is a South African cricketer. He made his first-class debut for KwaZulu-Natal in the 2016–17 Sunfoil 3-Day Cup on 9 March 2017. He made his List A debut for KwaZulu-Natal Inland in the 2017–18 CSA Provincial One-Day Challenge on 17 December 2017. He made his Twenty20 debut for KwaZulu-Natal Inland in the 2019–20 CSA Provincial T20 Cup on 13 September 2019.

References

External links
 

1998 births
Living people
South African cricketers
KwaZulu-Natal cricketers
KwaZulu-Natal Inland cricketers
Place of birth missing (living people)